Thomas Dunn (2 June 1873 – 24 June 1938) was a Scottish professional association footballer who played as a full-back.

Dunn played in the English Football League for Wolverhampton Wanderers and Burnley. After a spell at Southern League club Chatham Town, he joined Thames Ironworks, the club that would later be reformed as West Ham United. There, he helped the side to the Southern League Second Division title in 1898–99. He made 42 competitive appearances over his two seasons at the Irons.

References

1873 births
1938 deaths
Footballers from Falkirk
Scottish footballers
Association football fullbacks
Wolverhampton Wanderers F.C. players
Burnley F.C. players
Chatham Town F.C. players
Thames Ironworks F.C. players
English Football League players
Southern Football League players
FA Cup Final players